The River Dun (historically known as Bedwyn Brook) is a tributary of the River Kennet, flowing through Wiltshire and Berkshire in England. Its main source is in the parish of Great Bedwyn, Wiltshire and it flows  in a northeasterly direction into Berkshire. It discharges into the Kennet at Hungerford, which has a smaller average flow and width upstream of that point.

The Dun valley is an important transport route through the high chalklands between the London Basin to the east and the Vale of Pewsey to the west. It is the route by which the Kennet and Avon Canal (linking London and Bristol) enters the Thames basin from the Vale of Pewsey, crossing the watershed with the aid of the Bruce Tunnel and Crofton Pumping Station. The later Reading to Plymouth railway linking London and the south-west also follows the valley.

The Dun has two named tributaries: the Froxfield Stream joins on the left between Little Bedwyn and Hungerford, and the Shalbourne Stream on the right above Hungerford. During or after the building of the Kennet and Avon Canal in the late 18th century, the Shalbourne was diverted into it. In 2000 the stream was returned to its original course, rejoining the Dun via a culvert under the canal.

References

Dun, Northern River
Dun, Northern River
1Dun